This is a list of notable buildings and structures in Libya, organized by city:

Benghazi
Grand Hotel Benghazi (also known as the Berenice Hotel)
Tibesti Hotel
Uzu Hotel (also known as the Ozoo or Ouzou Hotel)

Tobruk
Hotel Tobruk

Tripoli

7 October Stadium
Al Waddan Hotel
Ali Alsgozy Stadium
Bab al-Azizia
Corinthia Hotel Tripoli
Darghouth Turkish Bath
Epigraphy Museum of Tripoli
Ethnographic Museum of Tripoli
GMR Stadium
Gurgi Mosque
Grand Hotel Tripoli (also known as the Al-Kabir Hotel or the Al Kabeer Hotel) 
Hotel Al Mehari
Islamic Museum of Tripoli
June 11 Stadium
Karamanly House Museum
Libyan Studies Center
Mitiga International Airport
National Archives of Libya
Natural History Museum of Tripoli
People's Hall
Prehistory Museum of Tripoli
Red Castle of Tripoli
Royal Miramare Theatre
Tripoli Cathedral
Tripoli Central Hospital
Tripoli International Airport

See also

List of museums in Libya

Buildings and structures in Libya